Koreans initially began to migrate to India during the earlier part of the 1950s. The Korean Association of India was established during that time period by a trio of South Koreans who went into exile, right after their release from the imprisonment in their own country. The 1990s, however, showed the actual beginning and growth of the migration which grew into approximately 1200 people during the following years. By the 2000s, the size of the Korean community grew immensely and became the 25th largest Korean community in the entire world. Some of the areas in India which show significant growth of the Korean community are Tamil Nadu, Karnataka, West Bengal, National Capital Region, Maharashtra, etc.

Varanasi
Varanasi or Kashi or Benaras is one of the major religious cities in India, situated beside the banks of the Ganges river in the state of Uttar Pradesh which welcomes tourists from all over the world.

‘Little Korea’ in the streets of Varanasi
Varanasi witnesses a huge numbers of Korean migratory people, due to their educational purposes fulfilled by the Benaras Hindu University, due to their bond with Buddhism and the legend of marital tie between Princess Heo of Ayodhya in India and King Suro of Gaya, an ancient kingdom in Korea. Places like Bengali Tola and some other parts of Varanasi are strewn with Korean style cafes, restaurants, K-Pop CD stores. A huge part of the Korean population is the students from Benaras Hindu University, studying about Indian arts and aesthetics.

Cafes and Korean cuisine
There are plenty of Korean style minimalist cafes in Varanasi, some of which are run solely by Indians as well as jointly with their Korean friends or relatives.

 Bona Café. It is decorated with wallpapers filled with Hangul scripts or Korean alphabets, traditional masks and fans along with low-seating arrangements. In addition to the Korean cuisine, the visitors can also get a taste of authentic Korean music.
 Raga Café: It is situated near Assi Ghat and was established by Ashish Dwivedi and his Korean friend Ju Jong, this café is more than 16 years old. He met Ju Jong in BHU or Benaras Hindu University and when saw the flourishing number of Korean tourists, decided to transform the bookstore on the ground floor of his ancestral house into a Korean café. A huge map of Varanasi penned in Korean language, decorates the entire café and the bookshelf is adorned with books in Korean language. They serve authentic tasty Korean cuisine like ‘Rabokki’ or ‘Bibimbap’, etc. Dwivedi also married a Korean woman named Sunhwa Cha and opened another café in Varanasi and an Indian café in Seoul. They are disciples of God Shiva, run an authentic Korean café and also organize classical Hindustani concerts and performances.
 Mong Café. The café is run by a local family consisting of aunt, niece and two brothers who learnt the recipes online. Two of their famous items are ‘Bibimbap’ or the traditional dish containing vegetables, chicken, sticky rice, soya sauce, soya chilli paste, sesame oil and ‘Rabokki’ -a street food made with ramen, rice cakes, spicy sauce, boiled eggs and noodles. One of the brothers, met famous South Korean poet Ryu Shiva while selling postcards. Shiva was so impressed by him that after three years when he visited Varanasi again, he asked the boy to visit Seoul and learn Korean language at the Seoul University. Their two cafes are decorated with framed pictures of Korean celebrities and they switch comfortably between various languages like Bhojpuri, Korean and Hindi.

Cultural exchange through music
Varanasi also has K-Pop CD, poster shows. A huge variety of Koreans, especially people from young generation have shown their enthusiasm in learning classic Indian music instruments such as, ‘tabla’ and ‘sitar’. Many of them are fluent in Hindi and thoroughly enjoy Indian art forms- cinema and music, etc. The similarity between musical instruments like the ‘Kayagum’ or ‘Gayageum’, an authentic Korean musical instrument containing 12 strings and the ‘Sitar’, an Indian instrument containing 18 or 19 or even 21 strings also helped by being an extension of the harmonious cultural exchange.

Learning the language
BHU offers diploma courses in Korean language, enabling Indian students to pursue an education in the language.

Extension of India in South Korea
A group of students from the prestigious Wonkwang Digital University or WDU from Iksan, South Korea, came to BHU to attend an exchange programme on ‘Ayurvedic’ and ‘Yoga’ and  upon their return, established a club named ‘Ganga’ in WDU. The university includes the Department of Yoga Studies and Meditation. Almost every year, a huge batch of Korean students come to BHU for the exchange programme, initiating the joint signing of MOU in the year 2005.

References 

 
 
 
 
 
 
 
 

Korean diaspora in Asia
Varanasi
Korean diaspora by city